New Horizons is an interplanetary space probe that was launched as a part of NASA's New Frontiers program. Engineered by the Johns Hopkins University Applied Physics Laboratory (APL) and the Southwest Research Institute (SwRI), with a team led by Alan Stern, the spacecraft was launched in 2006 with the primary mission to perform a flyby study of the Pluto system in 2015, and a secondary mission to fly by and study one or more other Kuiper belt objects (KBOs) in the decade to follow, which became a mission to 486958 Arrokoth. It is the fifth space probe to achieve the escape velocity needed to leave the Solar System.

It was the fastest (average speed with respect to Earth) man-made object ever launched from Earth. It is not the fastest speed recorded for a spacecraft, which as of 2021 is that of the Parker Solar Probe. The Jupiter flyby provided a gravity assist that increased New Horizons speed; the flyby also enabled a general test of New Horizons scientific capabilities, returning data about the planet's atmosphere, moons, and magnetosphere.

Most of the post-Jupiter voyage was spent in hibernation mode to preserve on-board systems, except for brief annual checkouts. On December 6, 2014, New Horizons was brought back online for the Pluto encounter, and instrument check-out began. On January 15, 2015, the spacecraft began its approach phase to Pluto.

On October 25, 2016, at 21:48 UTC, the last of the recorded data from the Pluto flyby was received from New Horizons. Having completed its flyby of Pluto, New Horizons then maneuvered for a flyby of Kuiper belt object 486958 Arrokoth (then nicknamed Ultima Thule), which occurred on January 1, 2019, when it was 43.4 AU from the Sun. In August 2018, NASA cited results by Alice on New Horizons to confirm the existence of a "hydrogen wall" at the outer edges of the Solar System. This "wall" was first detected in 1992 by the two Voyager spacecraft.

History 

In August 1992, JPL scientist Robert Staehle called Pluto discoverer Clyde Tombaugh, requesting permission to visit his planet. "I told him he was welcome to it," Tombaugh later remembered, "though he's got to go one long, cold trip." The call eventually led to a series of proposed Pluto missions, leading up to New Horizons.

Stamatios "Tom" Krimigis, head of the Applied Physics Laboratory's space division, one of many entrants in the New Frontiers Program competition, formed the New Horizons team with Alan Stern in December 2000.  Appointed as the project's principal investigator, Stern was described by Krimigis as "the personification of the Pluto mission". New Horizons was based largely on Stern's work since Pluto 350 and involved most of the team from Pluto Kuiper Express. 

The New Horizons proposal was one of five that were officially submitted to NASA. It was later selected as one of two finalists to be subject to a three-month concept study, in June 2001. The other finalist, POSSE (Pluto and Outer Solar System Explorer), was a separate, but similar Pluto mission concept by the University of Colorado Boulder, led by principal investigator Larry W. Esposito, and supported by the JPL, Lockheed Martin and the University of California. 

However, the APL, in addition to being supported by Pluto Kuiper Express developers at the Goddard Space Flight Center and Stanford University, were at an advantage; they had recently developed NEAR Shoemaker for NASA, which had successfully entered orbit around 433 Eros earlier that year, and would later land on the asteroid to scientific and engineering fanfare.

In November 2001, New Horizons was officially selected for funding as part of the New Frontiers program. However, the new NASA Administrator appointed by the Bush Administration, Sean O'Keefe, was not supportive of New Horizons, and effectively cancelled it by not including it in NASA's budget for 2003. NASA's Associate Administrator for the Science Mission Directorate Ed Weiler prompted Stern to lobby for the funding of New Horizons in hopes of the mission appearing in the Planetary Science Decadal Survey; a prioritized "wish list", compiled by the United States National Research Council, that reflects the opinions of the scientific community. 

After an intense campaign to gain support for New Horizons, the Planetary Science Decadal Survey of 2003–2013 was published in the summer of 2002. New Horizons topped the list of projects considered the highest priority among the scientific community in the medium-size category; ahead of missions to the Moon, and even Jupiter. Weiler stated that it was a result that "[his] administration was not going to fight". Funding for the mission was finally secured following the publication of the report. Stern's team was finally able to start building the spacecraft and its instruments, with a planned launch in January 2006 and arrival at Pluto in 2015. Alice Bowman became Mission Operations Manager (MOM).

Mission profile 

New Horizons is the first mission in NASA's New Frontiers mission category, larger and more expensive than the Discovery missions but smaller than the missions of the Flagship Program. The cost of the mission, including spacecraft and instrument development, launch vehicle, mission operations, data analysis, and education/public outreach, is approximately $700 million over 15 years (2001–2016). The spacecraft was built primarily by Southwest Research Institute (SwRI) and the Johns Hopkins Applied Physics Laboratory. The mission's principal investigator is Alan Stern of the Southwest Research Institute (formerly NASA Associate Administrator).

After separation from the launch vehicle, overall control was taken by Mission Operations Center (MOC) at the Applied Physics Laboratory in Howard County, Maryland. The science instruments are operated at Clyde Tombaugh Science Operations Center (T-SOC) in Boulder, Colorado. Navigation is performed at various contractor facilities, whereas the navigational positional data and related celestial reference frames are provided by the Naval Observatory Flagstaff Station through Headquarters NASA and JPL. 

KinetX is the lead on the New Horizons navigation team and is responsible for planning trajectory adjustments as the spacecraft speeds toward the outer Solar System. Coincidentally the Naval Observatory Flagstaff Station was where the photographic plates were taken for the discovery of Pluto's moon Charon. The Naval Observatory itself is not far from the Lowell Observatory where Pluto was discovered.

New Horizons was originally planned as a voyage to the only unexplored planet in the SolarSystem. When the spacecraft was launched, Pluto was still classified as a planet, later to be reclassified as a dwarf planet by the International Astronomical Union (IAU). Some members of the New Horizons team, including Alan Stern, disagree with the IAU definition and still describe Pluto as the ninth planet. Pluto's satellites Nix and Hydra also have a connection with the spacecraft: the first letters of their names (N and H) are the initials of New Horizons. The moons' discoverers chose these names for this reason, plus Nix and Hydra's relationship to the mythological Pluto.

In addition to the science equipment, there are several cultural artifacts traveling with the spacecraft. These include a collection of 434,738 names stored on a compact disc, a piece of Scaled Composites's SpaceShipOne, a "Not Yet Explored" USPS stamp, and a Flag of the United States, along with other mementos.

About  of Clyde Tombaugh's ashes are aboard the spacecraft, to commemorate his discovery of Pluto in 1930. A Florida-state quarter coin, whose design commemorates human exploration, is included, officially as a trim weight. One of the science packages (a dust counter) is named after Venetia Burney, who, as a child, suggested the name "Pluto" after its discovery.

Goal 

The goal of the mission is to understand the formation of the Plutonian system, the Kuiper belt, and the transformation of the early Solar System. The spacecraft collected data on the atmospheres, surfaces, interiors, and environments of Pluto and its moons. It will also study other objects in the Kuiper belt. "By way of comparison, New Horizons gathered 5,000 times as much data at Pluto as Mariner did at the Red Planet."

Some of the questions the mission attempts to answer are: What is Pluto's atmosphere made of and how does it behave? What does its surface look like? Are there large geological structures? How do solar wind particles interact with Pluto's atmosphere?

Specifically, the mission's science objectives are to:

Map the surface compositions of Pluto and Charon
Characterize the geologies and morphologies of Pluto and Charon
Characterize the neutral atmosphere of Pluto and its escape rate
Search for an atmosphere around Charon
Map surface temperatures on Pluto and Charon
Search for rings and additional satellites around Pluto
Conduct similar investigations of one or more Kuiper belt objects

Design and construction

Spacecraft subsystems 

The spacecraft is comparable in size and general shape to a grand piano and has been compared to a piano glued to a cocktail bar-sized satellite dish. As a point of departure, the team took inspiration from the Ulysses spacecraft, which also carried a radioisotope thermoelectric generator (RTG) and dish on a box-in-box structure through the outer Solar System. Many subsystems and components have flight heritage from APL's CONTOUR spacecraft, which in turn had heritage from APL's TIMED spacecraft.

(The Pioneers have hexagonal bodies, whereas the Voyagers, Galileo, and Cassini–Huygens have decagonal, hollow bodies.) A 7075 aluminium alloy tube forms the main structural column, between the launch vehicle adapter ring at the "rear", and the  radio dish antenna affixed to the "front" flat side. The titanium fuel tank is in this tube. The RTG attaches with a 4-sided titanium mount resembling a gray pyramid or stepstool. 

Titanium provides strength and thermal isolation. The rest of the triangle is primarily sandwich panels of thin aluminum face sheet (less than ) bonded to aluminum honeycomb core. The structure is larger than strictly necessary, with empty space inside. The structure is designed to act as shielding, reducing electronics errors caused by radiation from the RTG. Also, the mass distribution required for a spinning spacecraft demands a wider triangle.

The interior structure is painted black to equalize temperature by radiative heat transfer. Overall, the spacecraft is thoroughly blanketed to retain heat. Unlike the Pioneers and Voyagers, the radio dish is also enclosed in blankets that extend to the body. The heat from the RTG adds warmth to the spacecraft while it is in the outer Solar System. While in the inner Solar System, the spacecraft must prevent overheating, hence electronic activity is limited, power is diverted to shunts with attached radiators, and louvers are opened to radiate excess heat. While the spacecraft is cruising inactively in the cold outer Solar System, the louvers are closed, and the shunt regulator reroutes power to electric heaters.

Propulsion and attitude control 
New Horizons has both spin-stabilized (cruise) and three-axis stabilized (science) modes controlled entirely with hydrazine monopropellant. Helium is used as a pressurant, with an elastomeric diaphragm assisting expulsion. Significantly, had the backup option been taken, this would have meant less fuel for later Kuiper belt operations.

There are 16 thrusters on New Horizons: four  and twelve  plumbed into redundant branches. The larger thrusters are used primarily for trajectory corrections, and the small ones (previously used on Cassini and the Voyager spacecraft) are used primarily for attitude control and spinup/spindown maneuvers. Two star cameras are used to measure the spacecraft attitude. They are mounted on the face of the spacecraft and provide attitude information while in spin-stabilized or 3-axis mode. In between the time of star camera readings, spacecraft orientation is provided by dual redundant miniature inertial measurement units. Each unit contains three solid-state gyroscopes and three accelerometers. Two Adcole Sun sensors provide attitude determination. One detects the angle to the Sun, whereas the other measures spin rate and clocking.

Power 

A cylindrical radioisotope thermoelectric generator (RTG) protrudes in the plane of the triangle from one vertex of the triangle. There are no onboard batteries since RTG output is predictable, and load transients are handled by a capacitor bank and fast circuit breakers.

The RTG, model "GPHS-RTG", was originally a spare from the Cassini mission. The RTG contains  of plutonium-238 oxide pellets. Each pellet is clad in iridium, then encased in a graphite shell. It was developed by the U.S. Department of Energy at the Materials and Fuels Complex, a part of the Idaho National Laboratory.
The mission parameters and observation sequence had to be modified for the reduced wattage; still, not all instruments can operate simultaneously. The Department of Energy transferred the space battery program from Ohio to Argonne in 2002 because of security concerns.

The amount of radioactive plutonium in the RTG is about one-third the amount on board the Cassini–Huygens probe when it launched in 1997. The Cassini launch had been protested by multiple organizations, due to the risk of such a large amount of plutonium being released into the atmosphere in case of an accident. The United States Department of Energy estimated the chances of a launch accident that would release radiation into the atmosphere at 1 in 350, and monitored the launch because of the inclusion of an RTG on board.

Flight computer 
The spacecraft carries two computer systems: the Command and Data Handling system and the Guidance and Control processor. Each of the two systems is duplicated for redundancy, for a total of four computers. The processor used for its flight computers is the Mongoose-V, a 12 MHz radiation-hardened version of the MIPS R3000 CPU. Multiple redundant clocks and timing routines are implemented in hardware and software to help prevent faults and downtime. To conserve heat and mass, spacecraft and instrument electronics are housed together in IEMs (integrated electronics modules). There are two redundant IEMs. Including other functions such as instrument and radio electronics, each IEM contains 9boards. The software of the probe runs on Nucleus RTOS operating system.

There have been two "safing" events, that sent the spacecraft into safe mode:
 On March 19, 2007, the Command and Data Handling computer experienced an uncorrectable memory error and rebooted itself, causing the spacecraft to go into safe mode. The craft fully recovered within two days, with some data loss on Jupiter's magnetotail. No impact on the subsequent mission was expected.
 On July 4, 2015, there was a CPU safing event triggered by an over-assignment of commanded science operations on the craft's approach to Pluto. Fortunately, the craft was able to recover within two days without major impacts on its mission. NASA scientists therefore reduced the number of scientific operations on the craft to prevent future events, which could happen during the approach with Pluto.

Telecommunications and data handling 

Communication with the spacecraft is via X band. Besides the low data rate, Pluto's distance also causes a latency of about 4.5 hours (one-way). The  NASA Deep Space Network (DSN) dishes are used to relay commands once the spacecraft is beyond Jupiter. The spacecraft uses dual modular redundancy transmitters and receivers, and either right- or left-hand circular polarization.  

The downlink signal is amplified by dual redundant 12-watt traveling-wave tube amplifiers (TWTAs) mounted on the body under the dish. The receivers are new, low-power designs. The system can be controlled to power both TWTAs at the same time, and transmit a dual-polarized downlink signal to the DSN that nearly doubles the downlink rate. DSN tests early in the mission with this dual polarization combining technique were successful, and the capability is now considered operational (when the spacecraft power budget permits both TWTAs to be powered).

In addition to the high-gain antenna, there are two backup low-gain antennas and a medium-gain dish. The prime-focus medium-gain antenna, with a  aperture and 10° half-power beam width, is mounted to the back of the high-gain antenna's secondary reflector. The forward low-gain antenna is stacked atop the feed of the medium-gain antenna. The aft low-gain antenna is mounted within the launch adapter at the rear of the spacecraft. This antenna was used only for early mission phases near Earth, just after launch and for emergencies if the spacecraft had lost attitude control.

New Horizons recorded scientific instrument data to its solid-state memory buffer at each encounter, then transmitted the data to Earth. Data storage is done on two low-power solid-state recorders (one primary, one backup) holding up to s each. Because of the extreme distance from Pluto and the Kuiper belt, only one buffer load at those encounters can be saved. This is because New Horizons would require approximately 16 months after leaving the vicinity of Pluto to transmit the buffer load back to Earth. At Pluto's distance, radio signals from the space probe back to Earth took four hours and 25 minutes to traverse 4.7 billion km of space.

Part of the reason for the delay between the gathering of and transmission of data is that all of the New Horizons instrumentation is body-mounted. In order for the cameras to record data, the entire probe must turn, and the one-degree-wide beam of the high-gain antenna was not pointing toward Earth.  Previous spacecraft, such as the Voyager program probes, had a rotatable instrumentation platform (a "scan platform") that could take measurements from virtually any angle without losing radio contact with Earth.  New Horizons was mechanically simplified to save weight, shorten the schedule, and improve reliability during its 15-year lifetime.

The Voyager 2 scan platform jammed at Saturn, and the demands of long time exposures at outer planets led to a change of plans such that the entire probe was rotated to make photos at Uranus and Neptune, similar to how New Horizons rotated.

Science payload 
New Horizons carries seven instruments: three optical instruments, two plasma instruments, a dust sensor and a radio science receiver/radiometer. The instruments are to be used to investigate the global geology, surface composition, surface temperature, atmospheric pressure, atmospheric temperature and escape rate of Pluto and its moons. In addition, New Horizons has an Ultrastable Oscillator subsystem, which may be used to study and test the Pioneer anomaly towards the end of the spacecraft's life.

Long-Range Reconnaissance Imager (LORRI) 

The Long-Range Reconnaissance Imager (LORRI) is a long-focal-length imager designed for high resolution and responsivity at visible wavelengths. The instrument is equipped with a 1024×1024 pixel by 12-bits-per-pixel monochromatic CCD imager giving a resolution of 5μrad (~1arcsec). The CCD is chilled far below freezing by a passive radiator on the antisolar face of the spacecraft. This temperature differential requires insulation and isolation from the rest of the structure. The  aperture Ritchey–Chretien mirrors and metering structure are made of silicon carbide to boost stiffness, reduce weight and prevent warping at low temperatures. The optical elements sit in a composite light shield and mount with titanium and fiberglass for thermal isolation. For viewing on public web sites the 12-bit per pixel LORRI images are converted to 8-bit per pixel JPEG images. These public images do not contain the full dynamic range of brightness information available from the raw LORRI images files.
,

Solar Wind Around Pluto (SWAP) 

Solar Wind Around Pluto (SWAP) is a toroidal electrostatic analyzer and retarding potential analyzer (RPA), that makes up one of the two instruments comprising New Horizons Plasma and high-energy particle spectrometer suite (PAM), the other being PEPSSI. SWAP measures particles of up to 6.5keV and, because of the tenuous solar wind at Pluto's distance, the instrument is designed with the largest aperture of any such instrument ever flown.

Pluto Energetic Particle Spectrometer Science Investigation (PEPSSI) 

Pluto Energetic Particle Spectrometer Science Investigation (PEPSSI) is a time of flight ion and electron sensor that makes up one of the two instruments comprising New Horizons plasma and high-energy particle spectrometer suite (PAM), the other being SWAP. Unlike SWAP, which measures particles of up to 6.5keV, PEPSSI goes up to 1MeV. The PEPSSI sensor has been designed to measure the mass, energy and distribution of charged particles around Pluto, and is also able to differentiate between protons, electrons, and other heavy ions.

Alice 

Alice is an ultraviolet imaging spectrometer that is one of two photographic instruments comprising New Horizons Pluto Exploration Remote Sensing Investigation (PERSI); the other being the Ralph telescope. It resolves 1,024wavelength bands in the far and extreme ultraviolet (from 50–), over 32view fields. Its goal is to determine the composition of Pluto's atmosphere. This Alice instrument is derived from another Alice aboard ESA's Rosetta spacecraft. The instrument has a mass of 4.4 kg and draws 4.4 watts of power. Its primary role is to determine the relative concentrations of various elements and isotopes in Pluto's atmosphere.
 
In August 2018, NASA confirmed, based on results by Alice on the New Horizons spacecraft, a "hydrogen wall" at the outer edges of the Solar System that was first detected in 1992 by the two Voyager spacecraft.

Ralph telescope 

The Ralph telescope,  75 mm in aperture, is one of two photographic instruments that make up New Horizons Pluto Exploration Remote Sensing Investigation (PERSI), with the other being the Alice instrument. Ralph has two separate channels: MVIC (Multispectral Visible Imaging Camera), a visible-light CCD imager with broadband and color channels; and LEISA (Linear Etalon Imaging Spectral Array), a near-infrared imaging spectrometer. LEISA is derived from a similar instrument on the Earth Observing-1 spacecraft. Ralph was named after Alice's husband on The Honeymooners, and was designed after Alice.

On June 23, 2017, NASA announced that it has renamed the LEISA instrument to the "Lisa Hardaway Infrared Mapping Spectrometer" in honor of Lisa Hardaway, the Ralph program manager at Ball Aerospace, who died in January 2017 at age 50.

Venetia Burney Student Dust Counter (VBSDC) 

The Venetia Burney Student Dust Counter (VBSDC), built by students at the University of Colorado Boulder, is operating periodically to make dust measurements. The detector contains fourteen polyvinylidene difluoride (PVDF) panels, twelve science and two reference, which generate voltage when impacted. No dust counter has operated past the orbit of Uranus; models of dust in the outer Solar System, especially the Kuiper belt, are speculative. The VBSDC is always turned on measuring the masses of the interplanetary and interstellar dust particles (in the range of nano- and picograms) as they collide with the PVDF panels mounted on the New Horizons spacecraft. The measured data is expected to greatly contribute to the understanding of the dust spectra of the Solar System. The dust spectra can then be compared with those from observations of other stars, giving new clues as to where Earth-like planets can be found in the universe. The dust counter is named for Venetia Burney, who first suggested the name "Pluto" at the age of 11. A thirteen-minute short film about the VBSDC garnered an Emmy Award for student achievement in 2006.

Radio Science Experiment (REX) 

The Radio Science Experiment (REX) used an ultrastable crystal oscillator (essentially a calibrated crystal in a miniature oven) and some additional electronics to conduct radio science investigations using the communications channels. These are small enough to fit on a single card. Because there are two redundant communications subsystems, there are two, identical REX circuit boards.

Journey to Pluto

Launch 

On September 24, 2005, the spacecraft arrived at the Kennedy Space Center on board a C-17 Globemaster III for launch preparations. The launch of New Horizons was originally scheduled for January 11, 2006, but was initially delayed until January 17, 2006, to allow for borescope inspections of the Atlas V's kerosene tank. Further delays related to low cloud ceiling conditions downrange, and high winds and technical difficulties—unrelated to the rocket itself—prevented launch for a further two days.

The probe finally lifted off from Pad 41 at Cape Canaveral Air Force Station, Florida, directly south of Space Shuttle Launch Complex 39, at 19:00 UTC on January 19, 2006. The Centaur second stage ignited at 19:04:43 UTC and burned for 5 minutes 25 seconds. It reignited at 19:32 UTC and burned for 9 minutes 47 seconds. The ATK Star 48B third stage ignited at 19:42:37 UTC and burned for 1 minute 28 seconds. New Horizons took only nine hours to pass the Moon's orbit. Although there were backup launch opportunities in February 2006 and February 2007, only the first twenty-three days of the 2006 window permitted the Jupiter flyby. Any launch outside that period would have forced the spacecraft to fly a slower trajectory directly to Pluto, delaying its encounter by five to six years.

The probe was launched by a Lockheed Martin Atlas V 551 rocket, with a third stage added to increase the heliocentric (escape) speed. This was the first launch of the Atlas V 551 configuration, which uses five solid rocket boosters, and the first Atlas V with a third stage. Previous flights had used zero, two, or three solid boosters, but never five. One of the solid rocket boosters was hit by a door. The booster was replaced with an identical unit, rather than inspecting and requalifying the original.

The launch was dedicated to the memory of launch conductor Daniel Sarokon, who was described by space program officials as one of the most influential people in the history of space travel.

Inner Solar System

Trajectory corrections 
On January 28 and 30, 2006, mission controllers guided the probe through its first trajectory-correction maneuver (TCM), which was divided into two parts (TCM-1A and TCM-1B). TCM-1 was accurate enough to permit the cancellation of TCM-2, the second of three originally scheduled corrections. On March 9, 2006, controllers performed TCM-3, the last of three scheduled course corrections.

In-flight tests and crossing of Mars orbit 
During the week of February 20, 2006, controllers conducted initial in-flight tests of three onboard science instruments, the Alice ultraviolet imaging spectrometer, the PEPSSI plasma-sensor, and the LORRI long-range visible-spectrum camera. No scientific measurements or images were taken, but instrument electronics, and in the case of Alice, some electromechanical systems were shown to be functioning correctly.

Asteroid 132524 APL 

Because of the need to conserve fuel for possible encounters with Kuiper belt objects subsequent to the Pluto flyby, intentional encounters with objects in the asteroid belt were not planned. After launch, the New Horizons team scanned the spacecraft's trajectory to determine if any asteroids would, by chance, be close enough for observation. In May 2006 it was discovered that New Horizons would pass close to the tiny asteroid 132524 APL on June 13, 2006. The asteroid was imaged by Ralph (use of LORRI was not possible because of proximity to the Sun), which gave the team a chance to test Ralph capabilities, and make observations of the asteroid's composition as well as light and phase curves. The asteroid was estimated to be  in diameter. The spacecraft successfully tracked the rapidly moving asteroid over June 10–12, 2006.

First Pluto sighting 
The first images of Pluto from New Horizons were acquired September 21–24, 2006, during a test of LORRI. They were released on November 28, 2006.

Jupiter encounter 

More detailed exploration of the system began in January 2007 with an infrared image of the moon Callisto, as well as several black-and-white images of Jupiter itself.

The flyby was the center of a four-month intensive observation campaign lasting from January to June. Being an ever-changing scientific target, Jupiter has been observed intermittently since the end of the Galileo mission in September 2003. Knowledge about Jupiter benefited from the fact that New Horizons instruments were built using the latest technology, especially in the area of cameras, representing a significant improvement over Galileo cameras, which were modified versions of Voyager cameras, which, in turn, were modified Mariner cameras. The Jupiter encounter also served as a shakedown and dress rehearsal for the Pluto encounter. Because Jupiter is much closer to Earth than Pluto, the communications link can transmit multiple loadings of the memory buffer; thus the mission returned more data from the Jovian system than it was expected to transmit from Pluto.

One of the main goals during the Jupiter encounter was observing its atmospheric conditions and analyzing the structure and composition of its clouds. Heat-induced lightning strikes in the polar regions and "waves" that indicate violent storm activity were observed and measured. The Little Red Spot, spanning up to 70% of Earth's diameter, was imaged from up close for the first time. Recording from different angles and illumination conditions, New Horizons took detailed images of Jupiter's faint ring system, discovering debris left over from recent collisions within the rings or from other unexplained phenomena. The search for undiscovered moons within the rings showed no results. Travelling through Jupiter's magnetosphere, New Horizons collected valuable particle readings. "Bubbles" of plasma that are thought to be formed from material ejected by the moon Io were noticed in the magnetotail.

Jovian moons 
The four largest moons of Jupiter were in poor positions for observation; the necessary path of the gravity-assist maneuver meant that New Horizons passed millions of kilometers from any of the Galilean moons. Still, its instruments were intended for small, dim targets, so they were scientifically useful on large, distant moons. Emphasis was put on Jupiter's innermost Galilean moon, Io, whose active volcanoes shoot out tons of material into Jupiter's magnetosphere, and further. Out of eleven observed eruptions, three were seen for the first time. The event gave scientists an unprecedented look into the structure and motion of the rising plume and its subsequent fall back to the surface. Infrared signatures of a further 36 volcanoes were noticed. Callisto's surface was analyzed with LEISA, revealing how lighting and viewing conditions affect infrared spectrum readings of its surface water ice. Minor moons such as Amalthea had their orbit solutions refined. The cameras determined their positions, acting as "reverse optical navigation".

Outer Solar System 

After passing Jupiter, New Horizons spent most of its journey towards Pluto in hibernation mode. Redundant components as well as guidance and control systems were shut down to extend their life cycle, decrease operation costs and free the Deep Space Network for other missions. During hibernation mode, the onboard computer monitored the probe's systems and transmitted a signal back to Earth; a "green" code if everything was functioning as expected or a "red" code if mission control's assistance was needed. The probe was activated for about two months a year so that the instruments could be calibrated and the systems checked. The first hibernation mode cycle started on June 28, 2007, the second cycle began on December 16, 2008, the third cycle on August 27, 2009, and the fourth cycle on August 29, 2014, after a 10-week test.

New Horizons crossed the orbit of Saturn on June 8, 2008, and Uranus on March 18, 2011. After astronomers announced the discovery of two new moons in the Pluto system, Kerberos and Styx, mission planners started contemplating the possibility of the probe running into unseen debris and dust left over from ancient collisions between the moons. A study based on 18 months of computer simulations, Earth-based telescope observations and occultations of the Pluto system revealed that the possibility of a catastrophic collision with debris or dust was less than 0.3% on the probe's scheduled course. If the hazard increased, New Horizons could have used one of two possible contingency plans, the so-called SHBOTs (Safe Haven by Other Trajectories). Either the probe could have continued on its present trajectory with the antenna facing the incoming particles so the more vital systems would be protected, or it could have positioned its antenna to make a course correction that would take it just 3000 km from the surface of Pluto where it was expected that the atmospheric drag would have cleaned the surrounding space of possible debris.

While in hibernation mode in July 2012, New Horizons started gathering scientific data with SWAP, PEPSSI and VBSDC. Although it was originally planned to activate just the VBSDC, other instruments were powered on in order to collect valuable heliospheric data. Before activating the other two instruments, ground tests were conducted to make sure that the expanded data gathering in this phase of the mission would not limit available energy, memory and fuel in the future and that all systems were functioning during the flyby. The first set of data was transmitted in January 2013 during a three-week activation from hibernation. The command and data handling software was updated to address the problem of computer resets.

Possible Neptune trojan targets 
Other possible targets were Neptune trojans. The probe's trajectory to Pluto passed near Neptune's trailing Lagrange point (""), which may host hundreds of bodies in 1:1 resonance. In late 2013, New Horizons passed within  of the high-inclination L5 Neptune trojan , which was discovered shortly before by the New Horizons KBO Search task, a survey to find additional distant objects for New Horizons to fly by after its 2015 encounter with Pluto. At that range,  would have been bright enough to be detectable by New Horizons LORRI instrument; however, the New Horizons team eventually decided that they would not target  for observations because the preparations for the Pluto approach took precedence.

Observations of Pluto and Charon 2013–14 
Images from July 1 to 3, 2013, by LORRI were the first by the probe to resolve Pluto and Charon as separate objects. On July 14, 2014, mission controllers performed a sixth trajectory-correction maneuver (TCM) since its launch to enable the craft to reach Pluto. In August 2014, astronomers made high-precision measurements of Pluto's location and orbit around the Sun using the Atacama Large Millimeter/submillimeter Array (ALMA) (an array of radio telescopes located in Chile) to help NASA's New Horizons spacecraft accurately home in on Pluto. On December 6, 2014, mission controllers sent a signal for the craft to "wake up" from its final Pluto-approach hibernation and begin regular operations. The craft's response that it was "awake" reached Earth on December 7, 2014, at 02:30 UTC.

Pluto approach 

Distant-encounter operations at Pluto began on January 4, 2015. On this date, images of the targets with the onboard LORRI imager plus the Ralph telescope were only a few pixels in width. Investigators began taking Pluto images and background starfield images to assist mission navigators in the design of course-correcting engine maneuvers that would precisely modify the trajectory of New Horizons to aim the approach.

On February 12, 2015, NASA released new images of Pluto (taken from January 25 to 31) from the approaching probe. The exposure time was too short to see Pluto's smaller, much fainter moons.

Pluto and Charon appear as a single overexposed object at the center. The right side image has been processed to remove the background starfield. The other two, even smaller moons, Kerberos and Styx were seen on photos taken on April 25. Starting May 11 a hazard search was performed, looking for unknown objects that could be a danger to the spacecraft, such as rings or hithero undiscovered moons, which could then possibly be avoided by a course change. No rings or additional moons were found.

The object would be too distant to resolve surface features or take spectroscopy, but it would be able to make observations that cannot be made from Earth, namely a phase curve and a search for small moons. A second object was planned to be observed in June 2015, and a third in September after the flyby; the team hoped to observe a dozen such objects through 2018. On April 15, 2015, Pluto was imaged showing a possible polar cap.

Software glitch 
On July 4, 2015, New Horizons experienced a software anomaly and went into safe mode, preventing the spacecraft from performing scientific observations until engineers could resolve the problem. On July 5, NASA announced that the problem was determined to be a timing flaw in a command sequence used to prepare the spacecraft for its flyby, and the spacecraft would resume scheduled science operations on July 7. The science observations lost because of the anomaly were judged to have no impact on the mission's main objectives and minimal impact on other objectives.

The timing flaw consisted of performing two tasks simultaneously—compressing previously acquired data to release space for more data, and making a second copy of the approach command sequence—that together overloaded the spacecraft's primary computer. After the overload was detected, the spacecraft performed as designed: it switched from the primary computer to the backup computer, entered safe mode, and sent a distress call back to Earth. The distress call was received the afternoon of July 4 and alerted engineers that they needed to contact the spacecraft to get more information and resolve the issue. The resolution was that the problem happened as part of preparations for the approach, and was not expected to happen again because no similar tasks were planned for the remainder of the encounter.

Pluto system encounter 

Telemetry data confirming a successful flyby and a healthy spacecraft was received on Earth from the vicinity of the Pluto system on July 15, 2015, 00:52:37 UTC, after 22 hours of planned radio silence due to the spacecraft being pointed towards the Pluto system. Mission managers estimated a one in 10,000 chance that debris could have destroyed the probe or its communication-systems during the flyby, preventing it from sending data to Earth. The first details of the encounter were received the next day, but the download of the complete data set through the 2 kbps data downlink took just over 15 months, and analysis of the data continues as of 2021.

Objectives 
The mission's science objectives were grouped in three distinct priorities. The "primary objectives" were required. The "secondary objectives" were expected to be met but were not demanded. The "tertiary objectives" were desired. These objectives could have been skipped in favor of the above objectives. An objective to measure any magnetic field of Pluto was dropped, due to mass and budget issues associated with including a magnetometer on the spacecraft. Instead, SWAP and PEPSSI could indirectly detect magnetic fields around Pluto.

 Primary objectives (required)
 Characterize the global geology and morphology of Pluto and Charon
 Map chemical compositions of Pluto and Charon surfaces
 Characterize the neutral (non-ionized) atmosphere of Pluto and its escape rate
 Secondary objectives (expected)
 Characterize the time variability of Pluto's surface and atmosphere
 Image select Pluto and Charon areas in stereo
 Map the terminators (day/night border) of Pluto and Charon with high resolution
 Map the chemical compositions of select Pluto and Charon areas with high resolution
 Characterize Pluto's ionosphere (upper layer of the atmosphere) and its interaction with the solar wind
 Search for molecular neutral species such as molecular hydrogen, hydrocarbons, hydrogen cyanide and other nitriles in the atmosphere
 Search for any Charon atmosphere
 Determine bolometric Bond albedos for Pluto and Charon
 Map surface temperatures of Pluto and Charon
 Map any additional surfaces of outermost moons: Nix, Hydra, Kerberos, and Styx
 Tertiary objectives (desired)
 Characterize the energetic particle environment at Pluto and Charon
 Refine bulk parameters (radii, masses) and orbits of Pluto and Charon
 Search for additional moons and any rings

"The New Horizons flyby of the Pluto system was fully successful, meeting and in many cases exceeding, the Pluto objectives set out for it by NASA and the National Academy of Sciences."

Flyby details 

New Horizons passed within  of Pluto, with this closest approach on July 14, 2015, at 11:50 UTC. Starting 3.2 days before the closest approach, long-range imaging included the mapping of Pluto and Charon to  resolution. This is half the rotation period of the Pluto–Charon system and allowed imaging of all sides of both bodies. Close range imaging was repeated twice per day in order to search for surface changes caused by localized snow fall or surface cryovolcanism. Because of Pluto's tilt, a portion of the northern hemisphere would be in shadow at all times. During the flyby, engineers expected LORRI to be able to obtain select images with resolution as high as  if closest distance were around 12,500 km, and MVIC was expected to obtain four-color global dayside maps at  resolution. LORRI and MVIC attempted to overlap their respective coverage areas to form stereo pairs.

Meanwhile, Alice characterized the atmosphere, both by emissions of atmospheric molecules (airglow), and by dimming of background stars as they pass behind Pluto (occultation). During and after closest approach, SWAP and PEPSSI sampled the high atmosphere and its effects on the solar wind. VBSDC searched for dust, inferring meteoroid collision rates and any invisible rings. REX performed active and passive radio science. The communications dish on Earth measured the disappearance and reappearance of the radio occultation signal as the probe flew by behind Pluto. The results resolved Pluto's diameter (by their timing) and atmospheric density and composition (by their weakening and strengthening pattern). (Alice can perform similar occultations, using sunlight instead of radio beacons.) Previous missions had the spacecraft transmit through the atmosphere, to Earth ("downlink"). Pluto's mass and mass distribution were evaluated by the gravitational tug on the spacecraft. As the spacecraft speeds up and slows down, the radio signal exhibited a Doppler shift. The Doppler shift was measured by comparison with the ultrastable oscillator in the communications electronics.

Reflected sunlight from Charon allowed some imaging observations of the nightside. Backlighting by the Sun gave an opportunity to highlight any rings or atmospheric hazes. REX performed radiometry of the nightside.

Satellite observations 

Initial predictions envisioned Kerberos as a relatively large and massive object whose dark surface led to it having a faint reflection.

Post-Pluto events 

Soon after the Pluto flyby, in July 2015, New Horizons reported that the spacecraft was healthy, its flight path was within the margins, and science data of the Pluto–Charon system had been recorded. The spacecraft's immediate task was to begin returning the 6.25 gigabytes of information collected. The free-space path loss at its distance of 4.5 light-hours (3,000,000,000 km) is approximately 303 dB at 7 GHz. Using the high gain antenna and transmitting at full power, the signal from EIRP is +83 dBm, and at this distance the signal reaching Earth is −220 dBm. The received signal level (RSL) using one, un-arrayed Deep Space Network antenna with 72 dBi of forward gain equals −148 dBm. Because of the extremely low RSL, it could only transmit data at 1 to 2 kilobits per second.

By March 30, 2016, about nine months after the flyby, New Horizons reached the halfway point of transmitting this data. The transfer was completed on October 25, 2016, at 21:48 UTC, when the last piece of data—part of a Pluto–Charon observation sequence by the Ralph/LEISA imager—was received by the Johns Hopkins University Applied Physics Laboratory.

The brightness of the Sun from the spacecraft was magnitude −18.5.

On 17 April 2021, New Horizons reached a distance of 50 astronomical units (AU) from the Sun, while remaining fully operational.

Mission extension 

The New Horizons team requested, and received, a mission extension through 2021 to explore additional Kuiper belt objects (KBOs). Funding was secured on July 1, 2016. During this Kuiper Belt Extended Mission (KEM) the spacecraft performed a close fly-by of 486958 Arrokoth and will conduct more distant observations of an additional two dozen objects, and possibly make a fly-by of another KBO.

Kuiper belt object mission

Target background 
However, despite the large population of KBOs, many factors limited the number of possible targets. Because the flight path was determined by the Pluto flyby, and the probe only had 33 kilograms of hydrazine propellant remaining, the object to be visited needed to be within a cone of less than a degree's width extending from Pluto. The target also needed to be within 55AU, because beyond 55AU, the communications link becomes too weak, and the RTG power output decays significantly enough to hinder observations.

KBO Search 

In 2011, mission scientists started the New Horizons KBO Search, a dedicated survey for suitable KBOs using ground telescopes. Large ground telescopes with wide-field cameras, notably the twin 6.5-meter Magellan Telescopes in Chile, the 8.2-meter Subaru Observatory in Hawaii and the Canada–France–Hawaii Telescope were used to search for potential targets. By participating in a citizen-science project called Ice Hunters the public helped to scan telescopic images for possible suitable mission candidates. The ground-based search resulted in the discovery of about 143 KBOs of potential interest, but none of these were close enough to the flight path of New Horizons. Only the Hubble Space Telescope was deemed likely to find a suitable target in time for a successful KBO mission. On June 16, 2014, time on Hubble was granted for a search. Hubble has a much greater ability to find suitable KBOs than ground telescopes. The probability that a target for New Horizons would be found was estimated beforehand at about 95%.

Suitable KBOs 

On October 15, 2014, it was revealed that Hubble's search had uncovered three potential targets, temporarily designated PT1 ("potential target 1"), PT2 and PT3 by the New Horizons team. PT1 was eventually chosen as the target and would be named 486958 Arrokoth.

All objects had estimated diameters in the  range and were too small to be seen by ground telescopes. The targets were at distances from the Sun ranging from 43 to 44 AU, which would put the encounters in the 2018–2019 period. The initial estimated probabilities that these objects were reachable within New Horizons fuel budget were 100%, 7%, and 97%, respectively. All were members of the "cold" (low-inclination, low-eccentricity) classical Kuiper belt objects, and thus were very different from Pluto.

A course change to reach it required about 35% of New Horizons available trajectory-adjustment fuel supply. A mission to PT3 was in some ways preferable, in that it is brighter and therefore probably larger than PT1, but the greater fuel requirements to reach it would have left less for maneuvering and unforeseen events.

By the fall of 2014, a possible fourth target, had been eliminated by follow-up observations. PT2 was out of the running before the Pluto flyby.

KBO selection 
The necessary course adjustment was performed with four engine firings between October 22 and November 4, 2015. The flyby occurred on January 1, 2019, at 00:33 UTC.

Observations of other KBOs 

Aside from its flyby of 486958 Arrokoth, the extended mission for New Horizons calls for the spacecraft to conduct observations of, and look for ring systems around, between 25 and 35 different KBOs. In addition, it will continue to study the gas, dust and plasma composition of the Kuiper belt before the mission extension ends in 2021.

The new images allowed the science team to further refine the location of 15810 Arawn to within  and to determine its rotational period of 5.47 hours.

On December 5, 2017, when New Horizons was 40.9 AU from Earth, a calibration image of the Wishing Well cluster marked the most distant image ever taken by a spacecraft (breaking the 27-year record set by Voyager 1s famous Pale Blue Dot). These were the closest images taken of a Kuiper belt object besides Pluto and Arrokoth .

The dwarf planet Haumea was observed from afar by the New Horizons spacecraft in October 2007, January 2017, and May 2020, from distances of 49 AU, 59 AU, and 63 AU, respectively. It also observed Neptune's largest moon Triton (a captured KBO) in 2019.

Encounter with Arrokoth

Objectives 
Science objectives of the flyby included characterizing the geology and morphology of Arrokoth and mapping the surface composition (by searching for ammonia, carbon monoxide, methane, and water ice). Searches will be conducted for orbiting moonlets, a coma, rings and the surrounding environment. Additional objectives include:

Mapping the surface geology to learn how it formed and evolved
Measuring the surface temperature
Mapping the 3-D surface topography and surface composition to learn how it is similar to and different from comets such as 67P/Churyumov–Gerasimenko and dwarf planets such as Pluto
Searching for any signs of activity, such as a cloud-like coma
Searching for and studying any satellites or rings
Measuring or constraining the mass

Targeting maneuvers 
Arrokoth is the first object to be targeted for a flyby that was discovered after the spacecraft was launched. New Horizons was planned to come within  of Arrokoth, three times closer than the spacecraft's earlier encounter with Pluto.

The new mission began on October 22, 2015, when New Horizons carried out the first in a series of four initial targeting maneuvers designed to send it towards Arrokoth. The remaining three targeting maneuvers took place on October 25, October 28, and November 4, 2015.

Approach phase 
The craft was brought out of its hibernation at approximately 00:33 UTC  on June 5, 2018 (06:12 UTC ERT, Earth-Received Time), in order to prepare for the approach phase. After verifying its health status, the spacecraft transitioned from a spin-stabilized mode to a three-axis-stabilized mode on August 13, 2018. The official approach phase began on August 16, 2018, and continued through December 24, 2018.

At that time, Arrokoth was visible at magnitude 20 against a crowded stellar background in the direction of the constellation Sagittarius.

Flyby 
The Core phase began a week before the encounter and continued for two days after the encounter. The majority of the science data was collected within 48 hours of the closest approach in a phase called the Inner Core. At this distance, the one-way transit time for radio signals between Earth and New Horizons was six hours. Confirmation that the craft had succeeded in filling its digital recorders occurred when data arrived on Earth ten hours later, at 15:29 UTC.

Data download 

After the encounter, preliminary, high-priority data was sent to Earth on January 1 and 2, 2019. On January 9, New Horizons returned to a spin-stabilized mode to prepare sending the remainder of its data back to Earth. This download was expected to take 20 months at a data rate of 1–2 kilobits per second.
As of July 2022, approximately 10% of the data was still left to be received.

Post Arrokoth events 

In April 2020, New Horizons was used in conjunction with telescopes on Earth to take pictures of nearby stars Proxima Centauri and Wolf 359; the images from each vantage point – over 4 billion miles (6.4 billion km) apart – were compared to produce "the first demonstration of an easily observable stellar parallax."

Images taken by the LORRI camera while New Horizons was 42 to 45 AU from the Sun were used to measure the cosmic optical background, the visible light analog of the cosmic microwave background, in seven high galactic latitude fields. At that distance New Horizons saw a sky ten times darker than the sky seen by the Hubble Space Telescope because of the absence of diffuse background sky brightness from the zodiacal light in the inner solar system. These measurements indicate that the total amount of light emitted by all galaxies at ultraviolet and visible wavelengths may be lower than previously thought.

The spacecraft reached a distance of 50 AUs from the Sun, almost 7.5 billion kilometers (5 billion miles) away, on 17 April 2021 at 12:42 UTC, a feat performed only four times before, by Pioneer 10, Pioneer 11, Voyager 1, and Voyager 2. Voyager 1 is the farthest spacecraft from the Sun, more than 152 AUs away when New Horizons reached its landmark in 2021. The support team continued to use the spacecraft in 2021 to study the heliospheric environment (plasma, dust and gas) and to study other Kuiper Belt objects.

Plans 
After the spacecraft passed Arrokoth, the instruments continue to have enough power to be operational until the 2030s.

Team leader Alan Stern stated there is potential for a third flyby in the 2020s at the outer edges of the Kuiper belt. This depends on a suitable Kuiper belt object being found or confirmed close enough to the spacecraft's current trajectory. Since May 2020, the New Horizons team has been using time on the Subaru Telescope to look for suitable candidates within the spacecraft's proximity. As of November 2020, none have been found close enough to the trajectory of New Horizons for it to be able to make a close flyby with its remaining fuel.

New Horizons may also take a picture of Earth from its distance in the Kuiper belt, but only after completing all planned KBO flybys. This is because pointing a camera towards Earth could cause the camera to be damaged by sunlight, as none of New Horizons''' cameras have an active shutter mechanism.

However, it is not the fastest spacecraft to leave the Solar System. , this record is held by Voyager 1, traveling at  relative to the Sun. Voyager 1 attained greater hyperbolic excess velocity than New Horizons due to gravity assists by Jupiter and Saturn. The Parker Solar Probe can also be measured as the fastest object, because of its orbital speed relative to the Sun at perihelion: . Because it remains in solar orbit, its specific orbital energy relative to the Sun is lower than New Horizons and other artificial objects escaping the Solar System.New Horizons Star 48B third stage is also on a hyperbolic escape trajectory from the Solar System, and reached Jupiter before the New Horizons spacecraft; it was expected to cross Pluto's orbit on October 15, 2015. Because it was not in controlled flight, it did not receive the correct gravity assist, and passed within  of Pluto. The Centaur second stage did not achieve solar escape velocity, and remains in a heliocentric orbit.

 Gallery 

 Images of the launch 

 Videos 

 See also 

 2006 in spaceflight
 Exploration of Pluto
 List of artificial objects leaving the Solar System
 List of missions to the outer planets
 List of New Horizons topics
 Mariner Mark II, a planned family of NASA spacecraft including a Pluto mission
 New Horizons 2, a proposed trans-Neptunian object flyby mission
 Pioneer 10 Pioneer 11 Pluto Kuiper Express, a cancelled NASA Pluto flyby mission
 TAU, a proposed mission to fly by Pluto
 Timeline of Solar System exploration
 Voyager 1 Voyager 2''

Notes

References

Further reading

External links 

 New Horizons website by NASA
 New Horizons website by the Applied Physics Laboratory
 New Horizons profile by NASA's Planetary Science Division
 New Horizons profile by the National Space Science Data Center
 New Horizons Flyby of Ultima Thule – Best Places to Follow Future News.
 New Horizons Flyby – Musical Tribute by astrophysicist Brian May (who consulted on the project) and the band Queen.
 New Horizons Mission Archive at the NASA Planetary Data System, Small Bodies Node
 New Horizons: Kuiper Belt Extended Mission (KEM) Mission Archive at the NASA Planetary Data System, Small Bodies Node

 
NASA space probes
New Frontiers program
Missions to Pluto
Missions to Jupiter
Missions to minor planets
Radio frequency propagation
Spacecraft escaping the Solar System
Space probes launched in 2006
Articles containing video clips
Spacecraft launched by Atlas rockets
Nuclear-powered robots